List of rivers flowing in the Lesser Sunda Islands (Indonesian: Kepulauan Nusa Tenggara), Indonesia. The main Lesser Sunda Islands are, from west to east: Bali, Lombok, Sumbawa, Flores, Sumba, Timor, Alor archipelago, Barat Daya Islands, and Tanimbar Islands.

By Island
This list is arranged by island in alphabetical order. The respective tributaries indented under each larger stream's name.

Bali

Flores

Sumba

Sumbawa

West Timor

By Province

Bali

East Nusa Tenggara

See also
 List of rivers of Indonesia

References

Lesser Sunda Islands
 
Lesser Sunda Islands